A Sammy In Siberia is a 1919 American short comedy film featuring Harold Lloyd.

Plot
An inept American soldier (Lloyd) stationed in Russia during that country's civil war, becomes separated from his unit during a march in heavy snow. He flees from a scrawny, lone wolf and climbs up a tree when it pursues him.  He comes to the aid of a young Russian woman (Daniels) who, along with her family, is being harassed by a troop of Bolsheviks.  She has escaped from her cabin while the Bolsheviks were drunk on vodka.  She encounters Lloyd and the wolf.  Lloyd discovers that the wolf is harmless and is something of a pet to the woman.  The Bolsheviks see Lloyd and the woman and chase them back to the woman's cabin.  Lloyd initially hides in the cabin's attic.  Using his wits and an array of stunts, Lloyd manages to drive the Bolsheviks away. The film ends with Lloyd attempting to woo the woman.

Cast
 Harold Lloyd as The Boy
 Snub Pollard as The Russian Commandant
 Bebe Daniels as The Girl
 Sammy Brooks
 Lige Conley (as Lige Cromley)
 Wallace Howe
 Dee Lampton
 Gus Leonard
 Marie Mosquini
 Fred C. Newmeyer
 James Parrott
 E.J. Ritter
 Chase Thorne
 Noah Young

See also
 Harold Lloyd filmography

References

External links
 
 A Sammy in Siberia at SilentEra
 

1919 films
American silent short films
1919 comedy films
1919 short films
American black-and-white films
Films directed by Hal Roach
Films set in Russia
Silent American comedy films
Articles containing video clips
American comedy short films
Surviving American silent films
1910s American films
1910s English-language films